The Nordpasset, meaning "North Pass" in Danish, is a glacial valley in Peary Land, Greenland. Administratively it is part of the Northeast Greenland National Park.

The valley was first mapped by Lauge Koch during his cartographic air expedition of 1938. It was explored from the ground by Danish Arctic explorer Eigil Knuth together with Greenlander Jens Geisler in 1950 in the course of the Danish Peary Land Expedition.

Geography
To the north the valley is limited by Amundsen Land. To the south lies the Hans Tausen Ice Cap from which some glaciers flow into it.

See also
Sirius Passet

References

External links
Vertical air photo of the eastern part of Nordpasset.

Valleys of Greenland
Peary Land